Venkatapura is a village near Maski in the Lingasugur taluk of Raichur district in the Indian state of Karnataka. Venkatapura is a neolithic period site. 45 Cairns were found in the hills south to the village. 
Some of these cairns are 50 meters in diameter. Some are found in rings and pairs.
Venkatapura is 5 km from Maski town.

See also
 Maski
 Hatti
 Mudgal
 Jaladurga
 Raichur
 Districts of Karnataka

References

External links

Villages in Raichur district
Archaeological sites in Karnataka